Greek key may refer to:
Greek key (art), a decorative border constructed from a continuous line, shaped into a repeated motif
Greek key (protein structure), a repeated motif in the secondary structure in proteins

See also
Greek keyboard
Greek keyhole limpet